is a former Japanese football player. She played for the Japan women's national football team.

Club career
Kawasumi was born on October 30, 1972. She played for Tokyo Shidax LSC, Yomiuri-Seiyu Beleza and FC PAF.

National team career
On June 3, 1988, when Kawasumi was 15 years old, she debuted for the Japan national team against Czechoslovakia. She played two games for Japan in 1988.

National team statistics

References

1972 births
Living people
Japanese women's footballers
Japan women's international footballers
Tokyo Shidax LSC players
Nippon TV Tokyo Verdy Beleza players
Women's association footballers not categorized by position